The Anglo-Chinese School (ACS) Sitiawan (Malay: Sekolah Menengah Kebangsaan Methodist (ACS) Sitiawan (Secondary) and Sekolah Kebangsaan (ACS) Sitiawan (Primary)), established in 1903 is the oldest and established primary and secondary educational institution located in Sitiawan. Although both shared the same name, the two schools are of separate entity as both have different management that handles both the ACS primary and ACS secondary school's matter.

History
Both the primary and secondary schools shared a similar history. Founded in 1903, the school initially served as an orphanage with just four boys from Singapore. The original building of this school currently is located in Chung Hua Kung Hui (a multipurpose hall located in Kampung Koh). A year later the school's premises were moved to the opposite of Pioneer Methodist Church Sitiawan, which it still stands as of today. Under the leadership of the resident missionary Rev. B.F Van Dyke, it was expanded into a full-fledged school by a succession of missionaries. The school's current name did not exist until it was given  by Rev W.E. Horley in 1916, changing its name from Industrial School Sitiawan.

Some of the buildings on the school grounds were built prior to World War II, including the present ACS Primary School Hall and the four classrooms attached to it by a corridor. Construction of the hall began in 1931 by Rev D.P. Coole and completed in 1938. Originally, ACS Sitiawan is an all-boys school like many other ACS speckled around Malaya and Singapore at the time, until the school began accepting female students since 1927. During the Japanese occupation, the school was used as one a Japanese school to teach the Japanese language.

In 1947, ACS Sitiawan began its first School Certificate class. Two years later the first Malay Special Class was carried out. In 1955, ACS Sitiawan for the first time became an examination center for School Certificate Examination. One year after Malaya gained its independence from the British (1958), the primary and secondary schools were separated. The first Form 6 science stream class started in 1973 with a total of 24 students, preparing for the Higher School Certificate (H.S.C) examinations. This first batch had achieved 82% passing rate for H.S.C. examination. In 1977, the school offered arts stream for form 6 after the Methodist High School (MHS) Sitiawan had closed down and ACS Sitiawan recorded the best H.S.C. result in Perak in the same year.

In 2009, the ACS Secondary School Sitiawan had 986 boys and 805 girls, making a total of 1791 students, supported by 123 teachers. As for the primary school in the same year, it had 624 boys and 491 girls, making a total of 1115 students, supported by 69 teachers.

Currently, ACS Sitiawan is one of the largest schools in terms of students enrolment, from standard one to form six and consistently achieving excellent academic results at UPSR, PT3, SPM and STPM levels while having strong extra curricular achievement in various fields, producing alumni with solid background in various industrial as well as academic fields. Its incumbent principal is Mr. Peter Khiew Wai Mun, since 2019.

Academy 
ACS Sitiawan has ten classes for form 1, 2 and 3 for the Form Three Assessment (Pentaksiran Tingkatan Tiga) (PT3) exam. For form 4 and 5 students who are about to take the Malaysian Certificate of Education (Sijil Pelajaran Malaysia) (SPM) exam, there are nine classes for each form and is generally divided between the science and the arts stream. The science stream consists of two computer science classes, one accounting classes and one economics class. The art stream generally take subjects such as business, visual arts and general sciences.

The school offers form six courses. The pre-university students who are preparing for the Malaysian High School Certificate (Sijil Tinggi Persekolahan Malaysia) (STPM) in ACS Sitiawan will have the option to choose to go for science or arts stream, whereby the science stream comprises one physics and one biology classes while the arts stream have the option to choose a finance class, Malay language class, Chinese language/Visual Arts class and history class. This school is the largest form six education centre in Manjung district and the only two schools that offers form six science streams, the latter being Nan Hwa National Type Secondary School Sitiawan (SMJK Nan Hwa Sitiawan).

As the most prestigious school in Manjung, ACS Sitiawan too offers Chinese, Tamil and German as an initiative to ensure students are able to master at least three languages, in line with the Malaysian Ministry of Education.

Co-curricular Activities 
ACS Sitiawan offers uniformed units such as Military Band, Boys’ Brigade, Scouts Association of Malaysia, Malaysian Red Crescent Society, Malaysia School Youth Cadet Corps, Police Cadet, Girls’ Brigade, Girl Guides Malaysia and Puteri Islam. As for form six students, their co-curricular activities operate separately from the lower form students, but in general the uniformed units offered are similar with an addition of the Sixth Formers Society, where they are the student representative for the sixth formers.

The school band was founded in 1974 by Mr. Moses Tay, the school's former principal. Throughout its history, the band has involved in various activities such as marching with formations, street parade as well as wind orchestral competition. On the other hand, the school has the first Scouts association in Manjung, hence their name “01’ Manjung”.

The Interact Club and Chinese Language Society are some of the well-known cultural clubs in the school. Each year, the Interact Clubs will conduct charities such as recycling old materials, car wash services and also hosting the largest carnival in the school, dubbed Interact Carnival, selling foods and drinks as well as games to be played. This carnival usually attracts many around the town folks as well as their alumni. Chinese Language Society on the other hand hosts activities such as calligraphy competition, Spring Festival Concert as well as Autumn Festival Concert, featuring performances such as the 24 drums, traditional and modern dances as well as skits.

ACS Sitiawan has a multimedia department, known as Editorial Board of The Loyal Pioneer that primarily produce the school magazine The Loyal Pioneer since the 70s. The members consists of the students and each year the magazine will be published for current students as well as the fresh graduates of the school. These magazines generally are published either with hard or soft cover.

Facilities 
ACS Sitiawan has 35 classrooms to support its students. There are two halls, ACS Hall II and the auditorium. ACS Hall II is equipped with air cooler while the auditorium is a lecture hall equipped with folding tables and chairs as well as air cooler and air conditioner, located at the ground floor of Ir. Ling Leong Choong Building. The first floor of the same building consists of two computer laboratory and the computers are equipped with programming software such as Python IDE. ACS Sitiawan has a frog VLE room that employs hybrid learning (physical and online learning) with their Chromepad. This room was an initiative by the former principal Mr. Ding Kong Leong that served the school from 2013 until his retirement in 2017. The school has a canteen with four food stalls, selling Malay, Chinese and Indian food. There is a school cooperate store that sells the school stationaries, snacks and school attire. The school library is a two-storey building that sits adjacent to the ACS Hall II, equipped with air conditioning and contains fictional books, non-fictional books as well as reference books for all relevant syllabus offered in the school.

In the sports department, ACS Sitiawan has a tennis court, roofed basketball court, netball court, indoor badminton court and speak takraw court. The school has a large field outside the its compound shared with the primary school, which is largely used in track and field practices, football practices as well as the annual sports day event. Also, the school has a small field in its compound that is known by the communities as ACS Green. This site functions as the practice ground for the school band.

Achievements 
ACS Sitiawan is ranked as a five star school by the Ministry of Education Malaysia. It is also ranked having the best computer laboratory in the state of Perak in 2017. This school is the first in Manjung to offer Dual Language Programme.

The school band, ACS Military Band is actively involved in competitions such as the Perak State Marching Formation Competition from 2000 to 2009 which were held in Perak Stadium in Ipoh. The band had once won the best drum major award in district level in the year 2006 where the competition was held in the school field. ACS Military Band had won a silver medal in Malaysian National Band Competition (NATCOMP) state level, which was held in Shing Chung Secondary School, Sungai Siput in 2012. The band had once collaborated with Bethel Wind Symphony Orchestra from the United States to perform a concert in 2011. ACS Military Band is a bronze medallist for national level wind orchestra competition in 2013 (National Wind Orchestra Competition) and 2014 (National Wind Orchestra Festival), both organized by the faculty of music of Sultan of Idris Education University (UPSI). ACS Military band was involved in Royal Malaysian Navy Day parade in 2014, 2018 and 2019 respectively. On the 31st August 2020, ACS Military Band won a silver medal in the Online National Marching Parade Competition in conjunction with the country's 63rd anniversary of independence.

Students of the ACS Sitiawan are also active in various activities, such as joining the Langkawi International Regatta, national level sailing competition, football, badminton, taekwondo, chess, track and field, English debate, public speaking in English, cross country and silat. In 2015, a student made a history for the school in presenting his public speaking in front of His Majesty the Sultan of Perak, Sultan Nazrin Shah. In 2017, two students had successfully represented the school in the state level for cross country. In addition, the school's taekwondo team had participated in taekwondo championship in state levels, national games and SUKMA, raking in four gold medals for the school.

References

 ACS Sitiawan Official Webpage: http://smkmethodistacssitiawanperak.blogspot.com/
 ACS Sitiawan Official Facebook Page: https://www.facebook.com/smkmethodistacssitiawan/
 ACS Sitiawan Official YouTube Channel: https://www.youtube.com/channel/UCVQZaubgtCJElljNHHDXa_A

Primary schools in Malaysia
Secondary schools in Malaysia
Publicly funded schools in Malaysia
1903 establishments in British Malaya
Educational institutions established in 1903
Methodist schools in Malaysia